Bertrand of L'Isle-Jourdain may refer to:

Bertrand of Comminges (d. 1123), a native of L'Isle-Jourdain, bishop of Comminges
Bertrand de L'Isle-Jourdain (d. 1286), a native of L'Isle-Jourdain, bishop of Toulouse
Bertrand I of L'Isle-Jourdain (d. 1349), count of L'Isle-Jourdain
Bertrand II of L'Isle-Jourdain (d. 1369), count of L'Isle-Jourdain